The 2004 Molson Indy Toronto was the sixth round of the 2004 Bridgestone Presents the Champ Car World Series Powered by Ford season, held on July 11, 2004 on the streets of Exhibition Place in Toronto, Ontario, Canada.  Sébastien Bourdais swept the pole and the race win, his third consecutive win and fourth overall for the season.  In doing so he also took over the lead in the drivers championship standings, a lead which he would not relinquish for the remainder of the season.

Qualifying results

Race

Caution flags

Notes

 New Race Record Sébastien Bourdais 1:45:36.930
 Average Speed 83.749 mph

Championship standings after the race

Drivers' Championship standings

 Note: Only the top five positions are included.

References

External links
 Full Weekend Times & Results
 Friday Qualifying Results
 Saturday Qualifying Results
 Race Box Score

Toronto
Indy Toronto
Molson
2004 in Toronto